Rawkus Records was an American hip hop record label, owned by James Murdoch, known for starting the careers of many rappers. Rawkus started in 1995 with releases in hip-hop, drum and bass and fun-dustrial (Dystopia One).

Label heads Brian Brater and Jarret Myer then signed some of the top underground talent from the New York area, notably Mos Def, Talib Kweli, Hi-Tek and Company Flow, who went on to define the label's sound. The string of 12" releases and full-length albums that followed helped initiate a resurgence in the New York/East Coast sound. Many of these are considered classics among hip-hop aficionados. During the mid to late 1990s, Rawkus became a dominant label in the underground hip-hop scene, producing a string of gold albums and a platinum album.

History
Rawkus Records was established in 1995 by Brian Brater and Jarret Myer, with financial backing from their high school buddy James Murdoch, son of Rupert Murdoch. In 1996, Rupert Murdoch bought a majority of Rawkus. 
In 1999 the label entered into a distribution deal with Priority Records.

Over the years, Rawkus recorded several notable independent hip hop artists, including Reflection Eternal, Company Flow, the High and Mighty, Mos Def and Talib Kweli (as Blackstar), Eminem, Common, Pharoahe Monch and Skillz.

In 2002, Rawkus signed a joint venture deal with MCA. Soon after, MCA folded and Interscope/Geffen bought Rawkus. After the sale of its catalog in 2004, Rawkus split from Geffen.

In 2006, Rawkus signed with RED, a Sony Music distribution company and reemerged with a new line up of notable independent hip hop artists.

In early 2007, Rawkus Records accepted album submissions from Hip Hop artists, known or unknown, to be considered for their new campaign. The 50 artists chosen to wear the Rawkus 50 badge were signed to a digital distribution deal through IODA's (Independent Online Distribution Alliance) digital distribution network and had their albums released under the banner "Rawkus 50 presents".  Among the 50 were artists including Custom Made, L.E.G.A.C.Y. and Pizon.

Discography

1997: Company Flow - Funcrusher Plus
1997: Soundbombing
1998: Lyricist Lounge, Volume One
1998: Black Star - Mos Def and Talib Kweli are Black Star
1999: Company Flow - Little Johnny from the Hospitul: Breaks & Instrumentals Vol.1
1999: High & Mighty - Home Field Advantage
1999: Mos Def - Black on Both Sides
1999: Pharoahe Monch - Internal Affairs
1999: DJ Spinna - Heavy Beats Volume 1
1999: Soundbombing II
2000: Lyricist Lounge 2
2000: Hip Hop for Respect
2000: Ego Trip's The Big Playback - The Soundtrack to Ego Trip's Book of Rap Lists
2000: Big L - The Big Picture
2000: Talib Kweli & Hi-Tek - Train of Thought
2001: Smut Peddlers - Porn Again
2001: Hi-Tek - Hi-Teknology
2001: Da Beatminerz - Brace 4 Impak
2001: Various Artists - Scratch Vol 1
2002: Mad Skillz - I Ain't Mad No More (unreleased)
2002: Talib Kweli - Quality
2002: Kool G Rap - The Giancana Story
2002: Soundbombing III
2004: Talib Kweli - The Beautiful Struggle
2005: Best of Decade I: 1995-2005
2006: The Procussions - 5 Sparrows for 2 Cents
2006: Kidz in the Hall - School Was My Hustle
2006: Panacea - Ink Is My Drink
2007: Mr. J. Medeiros - Of gods and girls
2007: Blue Scholars - Bayani
2007: Marco Polo - Port Authority
2007: Panacea - The Scenic Route
2007: Sev Statik and DJ Dust - Back to Dust
2007: Point Blank - Don't Get Carried Away
2007: Hezekiah - I Predict A Riot

Rawkus 50 
The "Rawkus 50" marketing campaign saw the release of fifty digital hip-hop albums. They were all made available on 27 November 2007.

 12Bit - "Rawkus 50 Presents..."
 3rd Brillyance - "Grass Roots"
 Aarophat - "Aarodynamix"
 Attlas - "Rawkus 50 Presents..."
 Bekay - "The Horror Flick"
 Barak Yalad - "A Loss For Words"
 Chuck Taylor - "Black Hop"
 Clan Destined - "And For Our Next Trick"
 Custom Made - "Truth Be Told"
 Cymarshall Law - "Hip Hop in the Flesh"
 Cy Young - "Exactly"
 Doujah Raze - "Where You Are"
 Dutchmassive - "Crush Your System"
 Dynas - "Me, Myself and Rhymes"
 East - "The Right Direction"
 Finale - "Develop"
 Grand Agent - "Peak Oil"
 Hassaan Mackey - "Soul For Sale"
 Intricate Minds - "Self Hypnosis"
 Kaimbr - "Why Be Somebody Else"
 Kaze - "Block 2 the Basement"
 Kojoe - "Rawnin'"
 Krukid - "African"
 Laws - "Super Thug Killa Rap"
 LEGACY - "Rawkus 50 Presents..."
 Mookie Jones - "Catch Me If You Can"
 Mr. Metaphor - "The Evolution of Marc Bars"
 Phenetiks - "Revolutionary Non Pollutionary"
 Pizon - "I Am Hip Hop"
 Prime - "From the Ground Up"
 Protoman - "Grey Area"
 Red Clay - "The Red Dawn"
 Roddy Rod - "Blunt Park Sessions"
 Scanz - "Prelude to a Legacy"
 Scavone - "The Rehab Record"
 Sev Statik & Dust - "Back to Dust"
 Silent Knight - "Hunger Strike 2"
 Brooklyn Shanti - "The1Shanti"
 6th Sense - "It's Coming Soon"
 The Smile Rays - "Smilin' on You"
 Span Phly - "Two Weeks Notice"
 Spit Supreme - "Whole Life For This"
 Spokinn Movement - "60 Min. Spin Cycle"
 SunN.Y. - "Rawkus 50 Presents..."
 The Breax - "Rawkus 50 Presents..."
 The Foundation - "Forever Behind the Music"
 The Regiment - "The Come Up"
 Together Brothers - "Rawkus 50 Presents..."
 Wildabeast - "Many Levels"
 Willie Evans Jr. - "Communication"

References

External links
Rawkus at Discogs

Record labels established in 1996
Record labels disestablished in 2004
Hip hop record labels
American independent record labels